Kahkadan (also romanized as Kahkadān) is a village in Oshtorinan Rural District, Oshtorinan District, Borujerd County, Lorestan Province, Iran. At the 2006 census, its population was 2,382, in 611 families.

References 

Populated places in Borujerd County